Akron–Westfield Senior High School is a rural public high school within the Akron–Westfield Community School District in Akron, Iowa, United States. The area served by this school was officially merged from Akron and Westfield school districts in 1981. Their mascot is "The Westerner". Akron was a member of the Siouxland Conference from 1952 to 1975 before consolidation with Westfield, and then known as the Red Raiders. The school then joined the Little Sioux Conference, but left in 1979 to become a founding member of the War Eagle Conference.

Athletics
The Westerners compete in the following sports in the War Eagle Conference:
Cross Country
Volleyball
Football
 2002 Class 1A State Champions
Basketball
Wrestling
Track and Field
Golf 
 Girls' 2017 Class 1A State Champions
Baseball
Softball
 6-time State Champions (2005, 2006, 2010, 2011, 2013, 2014)

See also
List of high schools in Iowa

References

External links
 Akron Westfield High School and Middle School

Public high schools in Iowa
Schools in Plymouth County, Iowa
1975 establishments in Iowa